APR or Apr may refer to:

Economics 

 Annual percentage rate, the interest rate computed for an entire year
 The term includes the nominal APR and the effective APR

Organizations 
 Agrarian Party of Russia, a left-wing political party in Russia
 Alabama Public Radio
 American Public Radio, now Public Radio International
 Andy Petree Racing, stock car auto racing team
 Appian Publications & Recordings
 Armée Patriotique Rwandaise FC, Rwandan association football club
 Asia Pacific Rayon, Indonesian-based viscose-rayon producer
 Asia-Pacific Scout Region (World Organization of the Scout Movement)

Technology 
 Acoustic paramagnetic resonance, a resonant absorption effect used in magnetic resonance spectroscopy
 Acute phase reaction, a reaction due to the presence of inflammatory allergens
 Advanced port replicator, a docking device
 Ammonium perrhenate, a compound of rhenium
 Apache Portable Runtime, a library for the Apache web server
 ARP Poison Routing, spoofing of the address resolution protocol (ARP)
 Brügger & Thomet APR, the Advanced Precision Rifle, a Swiss sniper rifle
 The APR-1400 and APR+ advanced pressurized reactor, a series of South Korean pressurized water nuclear reactors
 Air-Purifying Respirator
 Automatic program repair

Other uses 
 Abdominoperineal resection
 Academic Progress Rate, an NCAA (National Collegiate Athletic Association) guideline
 Accreditation in Public Relations
 Acute phase reactant, a class of proteins
 Adleman–Pomerance–Rumely primality test to check whether a given number is prime
 African Peer Review Mechanism, an African Union self-monitoring mechanism
 Alberta Prairie Railway Excursions
 Alternative Press Review, a left-wing American political magazine
 April, as an abbreviation for the fourth month of the year in the Gregorian calendar
 The Chief Scouts' Advance Party Report, a review of Scouting that took place in the UK in 1966